Burlacu is a commune in Cahul District, Moldova. It is composed of two villages, Burlacu and Spicoasa.

References

Communes of Cahul District